The 1996 Italian general election was held on 21 April, resulting in a narrow win for the Romano Prodi-led centre-left coalition, The Olive Tree, which had a covenant of desistance pact with the Communist Refoundation Party, over the Silvio Berlusconi-led centre-right coalition, the Pole for Freedoms, in both houses of the Italian Parliament, the Chamber of Deputies and the Senate of the Republic. It resulted in the formation of the Prodi I Cabinet.

Chamber of Deputies

Overall results

Proportional and FPTP results

Senate of the Republic

Overall results

Proportional and FPTP results

Maps

Leaders' races

See also 
 Results of the 2022 Italian general election

Notes

References 

General elections in Italy
Election results in Italy